Tahri (also tehri, tehari or tayari) is a yellow rice dish in Bangladeshi cuisine. Spices are added to plain cooked rice for flavor and colour. In one version of Tehri, potatoes are added to the rice. In other variants soyabean chunks, vegetables, onions, tomatoes and many different spices are also added.

Etymology 
As per Monier-Williams Sanskrit-English Dictionary, the Hindi word Tahri is derived from Sanskrit word Tāpaharī, which is a dish prepared from rice, dal chunks (badi), vegetables, cooked in ghee with spices especially turmeric.

Origin
The recipe for Tahari has mentions with name Tapahari in Bhāvaprakāśa Nighaṇṭu,an ancient Ayurvedic treatise written in Sanskrit language. The recipe for Tahari also finds mention in Bhojanakutūhala, another Sanskrit book on cookery and culinary traditions. Bhojanakutūhala asserts that tāpaharī is a very famous dish in Northern India. The ingredients for cooking tāpaharī are black gram vaṭakas, rice grains, ghee, turmeric, wet ginger, asafoetida, water and salt. Vaṭakas were prepared from black-gram flour and mixed with turmeric, fried in ghee with washed rice grains. Adequate water with salt, ginger and asafoetida was added to this mixture. This preparation was called taharī or tāpaharī.

Popularity
Tahari became more popular during the Second World War when  meat prices increased substantially and potato became the popular substitute in biryani.
Tahari from Gulbarga in Karnataka,Parbhani ,Aurangabad and Nanded in Maharashtraare well known among variants from the Indian Deccan.

References

Pakistani rice dishes
North Indian cuisine
Indian rice dishes
Kashmiri cuisine
Street food